Ulrich Wilhelm (born 8 July 1961 in Munich) is a German lawyer and journalist who has been serving as director of the Bayerischer Rundfunk (BR) since 2011.

Career
On 19 March 2015 the Rundfunkrat des Bayerischen Rundfunks chose him for a second term by 31 January 2021. From 2005 to 2010 William was Chief of the Federal Press Office and Government Spokesman of State (Regierungssprecher) for the Cabinet of Germany (the First Merkel cabinet as well the Second Merkel cabinet).

Wilhelm took over the rotating chairmanship of the ARD in 2018 for two years. In 2020, he announced that he would not extend his contract with BR beyond 2021.

Other activities
 acatech, Member of the Board of Trustees
 American Academy in Berlin, Member of the Board of Trustees
 BMW Foundation, Member of the Board of Trustees
 Civis media prize, Ex-Officio Member of the Board of Trustees
 Deutsche Post Stiftung, Member of the Scientific Council
 Fazit-Stiftung, Chair of the Board of Trustees
 Frank Schirrmacher Foundation, Member of the Advisory Board
 Institute of Bavarian History, Ludwig Maximilian University of Munich, Member of the Board of Trustees
 Kissinger Sommer, Member of the Board of Trustees
 Lindau Nobel Laureate Meetings, Member of the Honorary Senate
 , Member
 Roland Berger Foundation, Member of the Board of Trustees
 Technical University of Munich (TUM), Member of the Board of Trustees
 University of Erlangen-Nuremberg (FAU), Member of the Board of Trustees

Recognition
Wilhelm was appointed in 2007 as a commander with a star of the Royal Norwegian Confederation.

References

External links

Politicians from Munich
German television journalists
German male journalists
1961 births
Living people
Christian Social Union in Bavaria politicians
Knights Grand Cross of the Order of Merit of the Italian Republic
ARD (broadcaster) people
Bayerischer Rundfunk people